Gerard Granollers and Jordi Samper-Montana defeated Taro Daniel and Alexander Rumyantsev 6-4, 6-4 to win the inaugural event.

Seeds

Draw

Draw

References
 Main Draw

Morocco Tennis Tour - Kenitra - Doubles
2013 Doubles
Tennis Tour - Kenitra - Doubles